Urumin is a naturally occurring 27-amino acid virucidal host defense peptide against the human influenza A virus. It was discovered and isolated from the skin of Hydrophylax bahuvistara, a species of frog found in South India, by a team of Emory University researchers. The team that discovered urumin tested the peptide against 8 different H1N1 and 4 different H3N2 viruses, as well as various other influenza viruses.  The peptide specifically targets the evolutionarily conserved H1 hemagglutinin stalk region of H1-containing influenza A viruses. Additionally, urumin was active against drug-resistant influenza A viruses, that were resistant against oseltamivir, zanamivir and peramivir . While its mechanism of action is not fully understood, urumin seems to inhibit viral growth by physically destroying influenza A virions, and is able to protect naive mice from doses of influenza A infection as high as 2 times the LD50. Because of its specific targeting of the hemagglutinin stalk region of the influenza A virus, the mechanism of action of urumin is similar to that of antibodies induced in the body by universal influenza vaccines. Urumin was also tested for toxicity against erythrocytes and showed a TD50 of 2,450 μM and TI of 664.7, indicating a favorable toxicity profile against erythrocytes.  As such, urumin may represent the basis for a potential first-line antiviral treatment against influenza A, particularly in the context of influenza outbreaks, although the discoverers of the peptide have stated that urumin is far from becoming an anti-flu drug. Urumin was named after Urumi, a sword used in Kalaripayattu, the martial art of Kerala, where it was discovered.

References

Anti-influenza agents
Peptides
Virucides